Al-Bāţinah was one of the regions (Mintaqat) of Oman. On 28 October 2011, Al-Batinah Region was split into Al Batinah North Governorate and Al Batinah South Governorate.

The region occupied an important location on the coast of Gulf of Oman. It lay between Khatmat Malahah in the north and Ras al-Hamra in the south, and confined between Al Hajar Mountains in the west and the Gulf of Oman in the east. Most of Oman's population were in that region, because of the green plains between the Hajar Mountains and the sea. 

Al Batinah Region contained the largest number of provinces (wilayat), numbering twelve: Sohar, Ar Rustaq, Shinas, Liwa, Saham, Al-Khaburah, Suwayq, Nakhal, Wadi Al Maawil, Al Awabi, Al-Musannah, Barka. Suwayq is considered as the biggest wilayah in the Batinah region.

Sohar was the regional capital. It is a populous city with a corniche, fish souq and numerous mosques.

Historic maps of Oman showing Batinah

See also
 Oman proper
 Tawam (region)

References

Regions of Oman